Thomas V. Chema, better known as Tom Chema, is an American academic administrator and attorney. Chema served as the 21st President of Hiram College from 2004 to 2013. Prior to becoming president of Hiram, Chema spent more than 30 years in business, government, and law.

Early life and education 
A native of East Liverpool, Ohio, Chema earned a Bachelor of Arts degree from the University of Notre Dame and Juris Doctor from Harvard Law School.

Career 
He began his career with the Cleveland-based law firm of Arter & Hadden in 1971 and became a partner in 1979. He took a leave of absence in 1983 to serve as Executive Director of the Ohio Lottery. In 1985, became Chairman of the Public Utilities Commission of Ohio.

Chema also serves in a number of national higher education associations including the Council of Independent Colleges, the National Association of Independent Colleges and Universities, the Annapolis Group, and with Ohio-based organizations such as the Association of Independent Colleges and Universities of Ohio, the North Coast Athletic Conference, and the Ohio Foundation of Independent Colleges.

In 1990, he was appointed executive director of the Gateway Sports and Entertainment Complex and was responsible for overseeing the public-private partnership that led to the financing and construction of Progressive Field and Rocket Mortgage FieldHouse in Cleveland. He then resumed his law practice and in recent years has consulted across the country on sports and entertainment-related economic development projects as President of Gateway Consultants Group.

Chema is recognized as an expert on energy and telecommunications economics and regulation, infrastructure planning, and developing public-private partnerships. He has published numerous articles on these topics and frequently lectures throughout the country, including assignments at the Harvard Graduate School of Design.

References

Sources 

Year of birth missing (living people)
Living people
Heads of universities and colleges in the United States
Hiram College
Harvard Law School alumni
University of Notre Dame alumni
People from East Liverpool, Ohio
People from Hiram, Ohio